The Sunshine Mosque is an Ottoman/Turkish-style mosque located in Sunshine, a suburb of Melbourne, Victoria, Australia. The mosque contains 17 domes, a minaret, and a courtyard. The mosque is owned by the Cyprus Turkish Islamic Community of Victoria.

History
In 1985, the Turkish Cypriot community in Melbourne saw the potential to build a mosque on a vacant block on Ballarat Road in Sunshine, Melbourne. Three members of the Cyprus Turkish Islamic Society offered their homes as guarantors to the Bank and became the owners of the lot for $191,000. Construction of the Turkish Cypriot Mosque began in 1992. The Mosque was designed to mirror the Sultan Ahmed Mosque in Istanbul, Turkey. According to a recent calculation by the committee of the Cyprus Turkish Islamic Society, the total expenditure of the Mosque exceeded $2,500,000.

See also

Islam in Australia
List of mosques in Oceania

References

External links
Official Website

Mosques in Melbourne
Mosques completed in 1992
1992 establishments in Australia
Sunshine, Victoria
Buildings and structures in the City of Brimbank
Turkish Cypriot diaspora